Legendary Swordsman may refer to:

The Denouncement of Chu Liu Hsiang, alternate title Legendary Swordsman, a 1983 Hong Kong film
The Legendary Swordsman, a 2000 Singaporean TV series